John Dyne may refer to:

John Dyne (MP for Hythe) (died 1413)
John Dyne (MP for East Grinstead) (fl. 1383–1414)
John Bradley Dyne, headmaster of Highgate School